"Drum bun" is a Romanian march composed by Ștefan Nosievici in 1856. It was one of the two male choirs he composed, the other being "Tătarul". The Society for Romanian Culture and Literature in Bukovina posthumously published the song in 1869 after Nosievici's death on 12 November of the same year. Although Nosievici composed the march, the lyrics were written by Vasile Alecsandri. Alexandru Flechtenmacher has also been attributed as the author of the song. It used to be very popular, especially among primary schools.

The song has also been identified as the "March of the Romanian Soldiers" (Marșul ostașilor români) or the "March of the Romanian Soldiers in Bessarabia" (Marșul ostașilor români în Basarabia).

"Drum bun" was sung during the Romanian War of Independence and World War I. Furthermore, the march appeared in Sergiu Nicolaescu's film Pentru patrie and is one of the songs played by the Representative Central Band of the Romanian Army.

Lyrics
The lyrics of the march (and their English translation) are the following:

References

External links
 

Romanian patriotic songs
1856 songs
Romanian military marches
Romanian-language songs